Self Destruction Blues is the third album by the Finnish rock band Hanoi Rocks, released in 1982. Although often listed as a studio album, Self Destruction Blues is a compilation of singles and B-sides that the band recorded in 1981 and 1982. None of the tracks on Self Destruction Blues, however, appear on their previous albums. Guns N' Roses were rumoured to have recorded a cover version of "Beer and a Cigarette" for their 1993 release "The Spaghetti Incident?". Of note is the fact that although Gyp Casino plays on the LP, his replacement Razzle actually appears on the cover.

"Dead by X-Mas" has been covered by the Japanese hardcore band The Piass in 1994, the US punk band The Hillstreet Stranglers in 2005, US punk band The Murder City Devils, the British electro group Sohodolls in 2007 and the Finnish rockabilly band Big Daddy & Rockin' Combo in 2008.

Track listing

Personnel 
Hanoi Rocks
 Michael Monroe – vocals, saxophone, drums on track 15
 Andy McCoy – guitars
 Nasty Suicide – guitars
 Sam Yaffa – bass
 Gyp Casino – drums on tracks 1, 3, 4 and 6-14
Additional musicians
 Razzle – vocals on track 15
 Keimo Hirvonen – drums on track 2 and 5

Chart positions

Album

Singles

References 

Hanoi Rocks albums
1982 albums